"Promise to Promise" is the twelfth single by Japanese recording artist Arisa Mizuki. It was released on July 24, 1996 as the first and only single from Mizuki's second compilation album Arisa's Favorite: T.K. Songs, which features the "Urban Street Mix" version. The "Straight Run" version was included on Mizuki's third compilation album Fiore II. The title track served as theme song for the first season of the Fuji TV drama Nurse no Oshigoto, starring Mizuki herself. "Promise to Promise" was written by Tetsuya Komuro and Takahiro Maeda, and composed and produced by Komuro, making it Mizuki's fourth single to be produced by Komuro. Komuro wrote the song after having read the script for the drama.

Chart performance 
"Promise to Promise" debuted on the Oricon Weekly Singles chart at number 17 with 34,470 copies sold in its first week. It stayed in the top 20, at number 19, on its second week, with 26,840 copies sold. The single charted for eleven weeks and has sold a total of 143,020 copies.

Track listing

Charts and sales

References 

1996 singles
Alisa Mizuki songs
Japanese television drama theme songs
Song recordings produced by Tetsuya Komuro
Songs written by Tetsuya Komuro
1996 songs